Florin Mergea and Horia Tecău were the defending champions, but they chose not to defend their title.
Arnaud Clément and Édouard Roger-Vasselin won in the final 4–6, 6–2, [10–3], against Martin Fischer and Martin Slanar.

Seeds

Draw

Draw

External links
 Main Draw

2009 Doubles
Challenger DCNS de Cherbourg - Doubles